HVJ Associates is an American geotechnical engineering firm based in Houston, Texas, United States. It is the largest minority-owned firm in Texas.

History
It was founded in 1985 by an African-American civil engineer, Herb Johnson. Johnson has also endowed a professorship in the name of Oswald Rendon-Herrero at the Mississippi State University.

In 1994, it was included in Inc. 500 companies.

In 2017, it received ACPA award for concrete-related work.

In 2019, it was included in Engineering News-Record (ENR) Top 500 Design Firms list.

In 2020, it was included in ENR Top 500 Design Firms list.

In 2021, it was again included in ENR Top 500 Design Firms list.

Franchising 
HVJ also operates a franchising model in which they start an office in a new location. After starting the branch, they implement the working culture of the firm, while training the branch manager. Once the revenue threshold is reached, the branch is converted into an independently-owned franchise with an asset purchase agreement.

Projects 
 Grand Parkway
 Houston Galveston Navigation Channel Project
 Scenic Woods Area Sewer Project

References 

1985 establishments in Texas